Sabine Herbst-Klenz (born 27 June 1974, in Leipzig, Sachsen) is a retired female butterfly and medley swimmer from Germany. She twice competed for her native country at the Summer Olympics: 1996 and 2000. Herbst is the daughter of Olympians Eva Wittke and Jochen Herbst, and the sister of swimmer Stefan Herbst.

Her son Ramon Klenz is also a swimmer. He broke the 32-year old German record of Michael Groß in 200m Butterfly.

References
sports-reference

1974 births
Living people
German female butterfly swimmers
German female medley swimmers
Swimmers at the 1996 Summer Olympics
Swimmers at the 2000 Summer Olympics
Olympic swimmers of Germany
Swimmers from Leipzig
Medalists at the FINA World Swimming Championships (25 m)
European Aquatics Championships medalists in swimming
Universiade medalists in swimming
Universiade silver medalists for Germany
Medalists at the 1999 Summer Universiade